Utaurora is an extinct genus of opabiniid, which were bizarre stem-arthropods closely related to true arthropods and radiodonts; the type species is U. comosa. The animal's fossils come from the Cambrian of Utah. This genus is so far the only other known unquestionable opabiniid, with the other being Opabinia itself. There are other animals like Myoscolex and Mieridduryn that could be opabiniids, but the classification of those two genera is still debated.

History of study
The holotype specimen of Utaurora comosa, KUMIP 314087, was collected from the Wheeler Formation in Utah. It was initially described as a specimen of Anomalocaris in 2008. In 2022, Pates et al. reinterpreted the specimen as an opabiniid and described it as a new genus and species.

Etymology
Utaurora is a portmanteau of Utah, in reference to where the specimen was found, and Aurora, the name of a Roman goddess. The reference to Aurora was chosen as she is a goddess of the dawn who turned her lover into an insect, and Utaurora is an early species close to the origin of arthropods. The species name is Latin for "hairy" or "leafy", and refers to the appearance of the animal, with a hairy-looking dorsal surface and leaf-like arrangement of caudal blades.

Description

Utaurora closely resembles Opabinia and Kylinxia, a pair of bizarre arthropods from the Burgess Shale and the Maotianshan Shales respectively, with 5 eyes and bizarre frontal appendages. Due to the incomplete discovery, it is uncertain whether Utaurora have these features as well. Utaurora differs from Opabinia in having more extensive setal blades covering its back and promixal region of each lateral flaps (covering only lateral flaps in Opabinia), giving it a hairy appearance, and in having a tail fan composed of at least 7 pairs of caudal blades (3 in Opabinia).

Classification

Based on its similarity to Opabinia, the discoverers of Utaurora classified it in Opabiniidae. Their phylogenetic analyses generally found support for an opabiniid position. A third possible opabiniid, Myoscolex is known from rocks of the Emu Bay Shale in South Australia. However, because morphological features supporting this classification are controversial, a hypothesis has been put forward suggesting It may also have been an early worm.

References

Works cited

Dinocarida
Cambrian arthropods
Prehistoric arthropod genera
Fossil taxa described in 2022
Cambrian genus extinctions